Vallelonga is a comune (municipality) in the Province of Vibo Valentia in the Italian region Calabria, located about  southwest of Catanzaro and about  east of Vibo Valentia.

Vallelonga borders the following municipalities: Filogaso, San Nicola da Crissa, Simbario, Torre di Ruggiero, Vazzano.

Vallelonghesi started to emigrate to Canada in large numbers in the 1950s, eventually forming a community of paesani larger than that in Vallelonga itself. Club Vallelonga-Monseratto hosts an annual Festa in the town of Loretto, Ontario.

Upon moving to Canada, many Vallelonghesi worked in the sewer/watermain and concrete industries, eventually forming their own companies.

Large numbers of Vallelonghesi can also be found in parts of Australia and Argentina.

Demographic evolution

References

Cities and towns in Calabria